Payette may refer to:

Places
 Payette, Idaho
 Payette County, Idaho
 Payette Lake, a natural lake in southwestern Idaho
 Payette National Forest, Idaho
 Payette Peak, in the Sawtooth Range of Idaho
 Payette River, Idaho

People
 Andre Payette (born 1976), Canadian ice hockey player
 Brayden Payette (born 2000), Canadian curler
 Fernand Payette (1921–1993), Canadian wrestler
 Francois Payette (1793–after 1844), North American fur trader
 Jean Payette (born 1946), Canadian ice hockey player
 Julie Payette, Canadian astronaut, 29th Governor General of Canada
 Lise Payette (1931–2018), Canadian journalist
 Louis Payette (1854–1932), Canadian construction contractor and mayor of Montreal, Canada

See also
 14574 Payette
 USS Payette County (LST-1079)
 
 Payet, a surname